Holtzclaw Creek is a stream in Clay County in the U.S. state of Missouri.

Holtzclaw Creek has the name of the local Holtzclaw family.

See also
List of rivers of Missouri

References

Rivers of Clay County, Missouri
Rivers of Missouri